Thryptomene biseriata is a species of flowering plant in the family Myrtaceae and is endemic to arid areas of southern central Australia. It is an erect, multi-stemmed shrub with more or less round to club-shaped leaves and pink flowers with five petals and five stamens.

Description
The petals are white or pink, slightly longer than the sepals and there are five stamens opposite the sepals. Flowering occurs in March or from October to December.

Taxonomy
The specific epithet (biseriata) means "arranged in two rows", referring to the sepals and petals.

Distribution and habitat
This thryptomene grows on red sand dunes in the north-west of South Australia and on the Nullarbor Plain and the Great Victoria Desert and Murchison biogeographic regions of Western Australia.

Conservation status
Thryptomene biseriata is classified as "not threatened" by the Western Australian Government Department of Parks and Wildlife.

References

biseriata
Endemic flora of Western Australia
Rosids of Western Australia
Flora of South Australia
Plants described in 1986